Defending champion Chris Evert defeated Martina Navratilova in the final, 2–6, 6–2, 6–1 to win the women's singles tennis title at the 1975 French Open. It was her second French Open singles title and her third major singles title overall.

Seeds
The seeded players are listed below. Chris Evert is the champion; others show the round in which they were eliminated.

 Chris Evert (champion)
 Martina Navratilova (finalist)
 Olga Morozova (semifinals) Julie Heldman (first round)
n/a
 Helga Masthoff (second round) Gail Chanfreau (second round) Raquel Giscafré (quarterfinals) Janet Newberry (semifinals)
n/a
n/a
n/a

Qualifying

Draw

Key
 Q = Qualifier
 WC = Wild card
 LL = Lucky loser
 r = Retired

Finals

Earlier rounds

Section 1

Section 2

Section 3

Section 4

See also
 Evert–Navratilova rivalry

References

External links
1975 French Open – Women's draws and results at the International Tennis Federation

Women's Singles
French Open by year – Women's singles
French Open - Women's Singles
1975 in women's tennis
1975 in French women's sport